Meen may refer to:

People with the name
Meen (surname)
Méen, a Breton saint

Arts, entertainment, and media
Meen (band), a Lebanese Rock band founded by Fouad and Toni Yammine
I.M. Meen, a DOS game made by Animation Magic

See also
The Me'en language, a Surmic language of Ethiopia
The Me'en people, a Surma people of southwestern Ethiopia
Mean (disambiguation)
Means (disambiguation)
Meme (disambiguation)